Burt Township is a civil township of Alger County in the U.S. state of Michigan. As of the 2010 census, the township population was 522.

The township contains the community of Grand Marais, which contains numerous historic structures, including the Pickle Barrel House and the Grand Marais Harbor of Refuge Inner and Outer Lights.  The township is also the eastern gateway to the Pictured Rocks National Lakeshore and includes the Au Sable Light on the shores of Lake Superior.

Communities
 Grand Marais is at the northern terminus of M-77 and is the eastern gateway into the Pictured Rocks National Lakeshore.
The station on the Mantistique Railway was named McDonald, but the post office was named for Frank Youngs, the first postmaster. The office operated from May 5, 1899, until May 15, 1901.

Geography

Demographics

As of the census of 2000, there were 480 people, 243 households, and 148 families residing in the township.  The population density was 2.1 per square mile (0.8/km2).  There were 715 housing units at an average density of 3.1 per square mile (1.2/km2).  The racial makeup of the township was 97.50% White, 0.62% Native American, and 1.88% from two or more races. 22.9% were of German, 10.5% French, 10.0% Irish, 9.0% English, 8.5% Finnish and 8.0% Polish ancestry according to Census 2000.

There were 243 households, out of which 13.2% had children under the age of 18 living with them, 54.3% were married couples living together, 5.3% had a female householder with no husband present, and 38.7% were non-families. 36.2% of all households were made up of individuals, and 21.4% had someone living alone who was 65 years of age or older.  The average household size was 1.98 and the average family size was 2.52.

In the township the population was spread out, with 13.5% under the age of 18, 3.3% from 18 to 24, 13.5% from 25 to 44, 36.0% from 45 to 64, and 33.5% who were 65 years of age or older.  The median age was 57 years. For every 100 females, there were 100.8 males.  For every 100 females age 18 and over, there were 102.4 males.

The median income for a household in the township was $27,500, and the median income for a family was $32,656. Males had a median income of $30,750 versus $25,208 for females. The per capita income for the township was $18,008.  About 3.4% of families and 7.2% of the population were below the poverty line, including 13.6% of those under age 18 and 4.9% of those age 65 or over.

Education
Burt Township is served by the Burt Township School District, which has its boundaries conterminous with the township.

Transportation

Airport
 Grand Marais Airport is located within Burt Township.

Highways
  runs south–north through the center of the township and terminates just before Lake Superior.
  travels east–west in and out of township and enters in the eastern portion of Pictured Rocks.

References

External links
 Burt Township official website

Townships in Alger County, Michigan
Townships in Michigan
Michigan populated places on Lake Superior
Pictured Rocks National Lakeshore